María Emilia Mernes Rueda (born October 29, 1996) known as Emilia Mernes or Emilia is an Argentine singer-songwriter, model, actress, and author. She became known for being part of the band Rombai. In 2019 signed with label Sony Music Latin and management company WK Entertainment represented by Walter Kolm. She was one of the songwriters of Lele Pons's single "Bloqueo".

History 
Born and raised in Nogoyá, Entre Ríos. Emilia's devotion to music began when she was just 12-years-old and her grandfather gave her a guitar. Since then, creating melodies, strumming her guitar, singing and dancing have become her passions. Like any girl, she studied in college. She had chosen Literature, but after 6 months she realized that this career was not her thing. So she went home and asked her parents that she wanted to study music at National University of Rosario. However, she never made it to her first class. In her spare time, she began to rehearse songs locked in the bathroom, because there were good acoustics. This is how she recorded her first cover and uploaded it to Instagram. From there, everything happened in fast motion. They asked her to do a casting in Buenos Aires, she traveled and got a place in the Rombai group. She replaced Rombai's former vocalist Camila Rajchman in 2016. Within a week, she was already doing her first show at Luna Park. Later, she left Rombai, became a soloist and went to live in Miami.

Career 
Before fame, she used to post song covers on social media before debuting as a singer with the band Rombai. In 2012, she modeled for the clothing brand 47 Street after winning a modeling contest. Emilia rose to fame in 2016 as lead singer of the cumbia-pop group Rombai. From 2016 to 2018, the group performed on some of the most important stages of Latin America, until Emilia announced her departure from the group to focus on her solo career.

In 2019, after signing a contract with W. K. Entertainment and Sony Music, ⁣ home of superstars acts such as Maluma, Wisin, CNCO, Carlos Vives and Prince Royce. Emilia released her debut single "Recalienta" which peaked at number 68 on the Billboard Argentina Hot 100.  In May 2019 she collaborates with Ana Mena and Nio Garcia for the song "El Chisme". In August 2019, she released with Darell, the single "No Soy Yo", whose video is starring Joel Pimentel from CNCO , Oriana Sabatini and Johann Vera.  On November 28, 2019, she collaborates in the song Boomshakalaka with Dimitri Vegas & Like Mike, Afro Bros, Sebastián Yatra and Camilo. In late 2019, Emilia released her third single, "Billion". On January 30, 2020, she released the video and the single "Policía". In March 2020 she collaborates with the MYA duo for the song "Histeriqueo". She also released along with Vevo the song "No Más" a song first presented in February via Vevo DSCVR. Which managed to become the only video clip within the platform to exceed 1 million views, 2 million views and 3 million views in 2020 (Only 9 songs have managed to exceed 3 million views in all history in Vevo DSCVR) regardless of language or genre, in a short period of time. Today it accumulates more than 3.5 million views on YouTube and 1 million views on Spotify. In May it was listed as an official song. Also, a model for brands such as Ripley in Chile and 47 Street in her native country, Emilia represents the global fashion brand Benetton as an ambassador.

Musically, Emilia's songs have been described as reggaeton, pop, and urban pop. Emilia as a composer wrote with other composers a song for Lele Pons called "Bloqueo". Emilia released "Já É Tarde (No Más)" on August 14, 2020, with the Brazilian singer Bianca. On October 15,she released his new hit "Bendición"  with the Puerto Rican singer Alex Rose. On May 18 she released Perreito Salvaje with the Panamanian singer Boza. On July 13 she released her new hit "Como si no importara" with Argentine singer and rapper Duki.

Personal life 
Emilia started dating Uruguayan singer Fer Vázquez in 2016 after being part of the band "Rombai". Then in 2018 they ended their relationship. In 2021, she announced her relationship with urban artist Duki via Instagram.

Filmography

Discography 

 ¿Tú crees en mí? (2022)

Awards 

Footnotes

See also 
 List of singer-songwriters

References

External links 
 
 
 
 Emilia official website

1996 births
Actresses from Buenos Aires
Argentine reggaeton musicians
Argentine female models
21st-century Argentine women singers
Argentine pop singers
Latin music songwriters
Latin pop singers
Living people
English-language singers from Argentina
Spanish-language singers
Sony Music Latin artists
Urbano musicians
Argentine women singer-songwriters
21st-century Argentine women
Women in Latin music